The 1969–70 Athenian League season was the 47th in the history of Athenian League. The league consisted of 48 teams.

Premier Division

The division featured two new teams, both promoted from last season's Division One:
 Tilbury  (1st)
 Eastbourne United (2nd)

League table

Division One

The division featured 4 new teams:
 2 relegated from last season's Premier Division:
 Hornchurch (15th)
 Hounslow  (16th)
 2 promoted from last season's Division Two:
 Boreham Wood (1st)
 Aveley (2nd)

League table

Division Two

The division featured 2 new teams, all relegated from last season's Division One:
 Hemel Hempstead Town (15th)
 Leyton (16th)

League table

References

1969–70 in English football leagues
Athenian League